For the Corinthian of the 7th century, see Demaratus of Corinth

Demaratus was a Corinthian prominent amongst the pro-Macedonians  and connected by hospitality with the family of Philip II of Macedon. It was through the mediation of Demaratus that Alexander was able to return home from Illyria.  (Alexander had left Macedon for Illyria following his quarrel with his father after the marriage of Philip to Cleopatra Eurydice.) 

Demaratus was almost certainly present in Aegae when Philip was assassinated in 336 BC, and in 334 BC he accompanied Alexander on the Asiatic expedition as one of his hetairoi. He is said to have wept with joy to see Alexander seated on Darius' throne at Susa. Demaratus died shortly before the Indian campaign; his remains were sent back to Corinth with appropriate honours.

References

Who's Who in the Age of Alexander the Great by Waldemar Heckel 

Ancient Corinthians
Generals of Alexander the Great
Hetairoi
Courtiers of Alexander the Great
Courtiers of Philip II of Macedon